Verjon is a commune in the Ain department in eastern France.

Geography
The Solnan has its source in the commune and forms part of its southwestern border.

Population

See also
Communes of the Ain department

References

Communes of Ain
Ain communes articles needing translation from French Wikipedia